"Old Flame" is a song written by Donny Lowery and Mac McAnally, and recorded by American country music band Alabama.  It was released in January 1981 as the first single from the album Feels So Right.  The song was the group's third number-one single on the Billboard Hot Country Singles chart.

Critical reception
According to Allmusic reviewer Al Campbell, it represented a traditional side to Alabama's repertoire.

In popular culture
The song is played on the FX series, The Americans; Season 5, Episode 3 ("The Midges"), while Elizabeth and Phillip begin a slow dance.

Charts

References

Works cited
Morris, Edward, "Alabama," Contemporary Books Inc., Chicago, 1985
 [ Allmusic - Old Flame by Alabama].

External links
 

1981 singles
1981 songs
Alabama (American band) songs
Songs written by Mac McAnally
Song recordings produced by Harold Shedd
RCA Records Nashville singles
Songs written by Donny Lowery